Pieroni is an Italian surname. Notable people with the surname include:

 Alessandro Pieroni (1550–1607), Italian architect and painter
 Andrea Pieroni (born 1967), Italo-German ethnobiologist
 Ania Pieroni (born 1957), former Italian actress
 Blake Pieroni (born 1995), American competition swimmer
 Fanny Pieroni-Davenport, Italian painter 
 Giovanni de Galliano Pieroni (1586–1654), Italian military engineer specializing in erecting fortifications
 Luigi Pieroni (born 1980), former Belgian football striker
 Margaret Pieroni, Australian botanical artist and botanist 
 

Italian-language surnames
Surnames from given names